Ñuñuni Qalani (Aymara ñuñu breast, qala stone, -ni a suffix to indicate ownership, also spelled Nununi Khalani) is a mountain in the Andes of Bolivia, about  high. It is located in the La Paz Department, Larecaja Province, Guanay Municipality. Ñuñuni Qalani lies in the eastern extensions of the Cordillera Real. It is situated south-east of the river Uma Pallqa ("water bifurcation", Uma Palca) and the village of Uma Pallqa.

References 

Mountains of La Paz Department (Bolivia)